Redbridge is a London Underground station on Eastern Avenue in the Redbridge district of Ilford in North East London, on the Hainault Loop of the Central line, in Zone 4. It opened on 14 December 1947 as an extension of the Central line to form the new part of the Hainault loop.

History
The extension of the Central line eastwards from Liverpool Street was first proposed in 1935 by the London Passenger Transport Board. The station at Ilford West (Red House) would be one of three stations in Tube tunnel between Leytonstone and Newbury Park.

Construction had begun in the mid 1930s, but was delayed by the onset of the Second World War. During the war, the completed train tunnels at Redbridge were used by the Plessey company as an aircraft parts factory between 1942 and 1945. 

The station was opened on 14 December 1947. The station building was designed by renowned Tube architect, Charles Holden, who also designed the other two below ground stations on the branch. Originally, the station was to have been named "West Ilford", then this changed to "Red House", before the final decision was made on "Redbridge" (also given in the plans as "Red Bridge").

Since the station was built, a large roundabout has been constructed next to it, being a junction between the A406 (originally the terminal section of the M11), and the A12.

Redbridge is often described as the shallowest deep level (as opposed to cut-and-cover) station on the network, as it is only  beneath the surface. However, this is misleading as the station tunnel was constructed by the cut-and-cover method, with the running lines descending into genuine tube tunnels at either end of the platforms – similar to the Central line platforms at Mile End.

In July 2011 it was granted Grade II listed building status by English Heritage.

Connections
London Buses routes 66, 145 and 366 and night route N8 serve the station.

Inside the station

References

External links

 Redbridge station at CharlesHolden.com
 More photos of this station
 RedRag (Redbridge Roundabout Action Group) achieves bus rerouting at the station

Central line (London Underground) stations
London Underground Night Tube stations
Tube stations in the London Borough of Redbridge
Railway stations in Great Britain opened in 1947
Charles Holden railway stations
Art Deco architecture in London
1947 establishments in England
Grade II listed buildings in the London Borough of Redbridge
Grade II listed railway stations